This is a list of academics of the University of Oxford by the academic disciplines. Many were also fellows and/or tutors at the colleges of the University. Some people multiple times, under different discipline headings.

This list forms part of a series of lists of people associated with the University of Oxford; for other lists, please see the main article List of University of Oxford people.

Law

Philosophy

Lists of people associated with the University of Oxford